Xabier Mikel Azparren Irurzun (born 25 February 1999) is a Spanish cyclist, who currently rides for UCI ProTeam .

Major results

2016
 1st  Time trial, National Junior Road Championships
 National Junior Track Championships
1st  Madison (with Imanol Inasa)
1st  Team pursuit
2017
 National Junior Track Championships
1st  Madison (with Unai Iribar)
1st  Team pursuit
 2nd Time trial, National Junior Road Championships
2019
 1st  Time trial, National Under-23 Road Championships
2020
 1st  Madison, National Track Championships (with Illart Zuazubiskar)
2021
 9th Overall Etoile d'Or
2022
 2nd Overall Volta ao Alentejo
1st Stage 2 
 3rd Time trial, National Road Championships
2023
 9th Overall Saudi Tour

Grand Tour general classification results timeline

References

External links

1999 births
Living people
Spanish male cyclists
Cyclists from the Basque Country (autonomous community)
Sportspeople from San Sebastián